Austin Krajicek was the defending champion, but lost in the first round to Adrián Menéndez-Maceiras.

Michael Berrer won the title, defeating João Souza 6–3, 6–2 in the final.

Seeds

Draw

Finals

Top half

Bottom half

References
Main Draw
Qualifying Draw

Torneo Internacional Challenger León - Singles
Torneo Internacional Challenger León